Lahourcade is a commune in the Pyrénées-Atlantiques department in south-western France.

Geography
Neighbouring communes:
North: Lagor, Mourenx and Noguères
East: Pardies 
South-East: Monein 
South-West: Lucq-de-Béarn

Administration

See also
Communes of the Pyrénées-Atlantiques department

References

Communes of Pyrénées-Atlantiques